The 2016 Thindown Challenger Biella is a professional tennis tournament played on outdoor red clay courts. It is part of the 2016 ATP Challenger Tour. It took place in Biella, Italy between 25 and 31 July 2016.

Entrants

Seeds

 Rankings are as of July 18, 2016.

Other entrants
The following players received wildcards into the singles main draw:
  Paolo Lorenzi
  Gianluca Mager
  Stefano Napolitano
  Gianluigi Quinzi

The following player received entry into the singles main draw as a special exempt:
  Aslan Karatsev

The following players received entry from the qualifying draw:
  Tomislav Brkić
  Andrea Collarini
  Viktor Galović
  Francisco Bahamonde

Champions

Singles

 Federico Gaio def.  Thomaz Bellucci 7–6(7–5), 6–2.

Doubles

 Andre Begemann /  Leander Paes def.  Andrej Martin /  Hans Podlipnik 6–4, 6–4.

External links
Official website
ITF search

Thindown Challenger Biella
Tennis tournaments in Italy